Aliyah Boston (born December 11, 2001) is an American college basketball player for the South Carolina Gamecocks of the Southeastern Conference (SEC). She plays the power forward and center positions.

Born in Saint Thomas, United States Virgin Islands, Boston attended Worcester Academy in Worcester, Massachusetts, where she was a McDonald's All-American and a three-time Massachusetts Gatorade Player of the Year. Boston has won several gold medals representing the United States.

Boston led South Carolina to their second national championship in school history in 2022 and was named the NCAA Tournament Most Outstanding Player (MOP). That year, she also won Player of the Year and Defensive Player of the Year honors. Boston won the Lisa Leslie Award as the best center in NCAA women's basketball in three consecutive years.

Early life
Boston was born on December 11, 2001, to parents Cleone and Al in Saint Thomas, U.S. Virgin Islands. Boston fell in love with basketball at age 9 watching her older sister Alexis play. At age 12, Aliyah and Alexis moved from their home in the Virgin Islands, to New England to live with their aunt, Jenaire Hodge, and her cousin, Kira Punter. Boston would only see her parents a few times over the following years, mostly to watch Aliyah's AAU basketball games.

High school career
Boston attended Worcester Academy in Worcester, Massachusetts, winning Gatorade Massachusetts Player of the Year honors in 2017, 2018, and 2019. Boston led her team to a to 24-1 record and a second straight New England Prep School Athletic Council (NEPSAC) Class A championship in 2019. That year, she was a consensus All-American, averaging 17.3 points, 10.6 rebounds and 3.2 blocks per game. Boston was selected to play in the McDonald's All-American Game and the Jordan Brand Classic in 2019.

A five-star recruit, Boston was ranked third in the ESPN HoopGurlz 2019 class. Boston committed to Dawn Staley and the South Carolina Gamecocks over UConn, Ohio State, and Notre Dame, giving the Gamecocks the consensus number one recruiting class for 2019.

College career

Freshman season

In her first game at the University of South Carolina on November 5, 2019, Boston posted the first triple-double by a freshman in program history and the first by any NCAA Division I player in her career debut against Alabama State, including a school-record tying 10 blocks. Boston helped lead the Gamecocks to a big early season road win at No. 4 Maryland scoring eight of the team's first 10 points and blocking five shots in the opening quarter. In the Paradise Jam, Boston won Reef division MVP after she had 20 points, and 13 rebounds in a win against No. 2 Baylor clinching the tournament championship. On January 20, Boston notched her eighth double-double of the season finishing with 12 rebounds, and 21 points in a win over No. 9 Mississippi State. Boston played a huge role in the No. 1 Gamecocks first ever victory over the UConn Huskies on February 10, capturing her tenth double double of the year.

Against LSU, Boston blocked five shots to become the program's all-time freshman blocks leader in a win.
Boston would finish the SEC regular season Averaging a double-double against SEC competition (13.1 ppg/10.3 rpg) as the No. 1 Gamecocks (32-1) swept the SEC regular season and tournament championships.

Boston was named consensus Freshman of the year, and was Part of first team in Gamecock history to end the season ranked No. 1 in the nation, claiming that spot in both the AP and the USA Today Coaches' Poll, before the Tournament was cancelled due to the COVID-19 pandemic lockdowns.

Sophomore season

Boston started off the season hot against 23rd ranked Iowa State, recording five of the team's first 10 points which included a 3 pointer, she then scored four of her season high 13 points off offensive rebounds. Against Florida, Boston continued to show her all around game when she hit three 3's and recorded 28 points, 16 rebounds, and 4 blocks. Scoring 19 points, and 11 rebounds in the first half and became the 11th fastest Gamecock to score 500 points in her career. On January 10 in a win at 10th ranked Kentucky, Boston put up 20 points and 12 rebounds, scoring her fourth double double of the season and also included seven blocks, she would earn SEC co-player of the week honors. Boston helped secure a 104–82 win over 17th ranked Arkansas; she finished with 26 points and 16 rebounds. she scored six points, six rebounds and three blocks in the game's opening five minutes. On January 21 in a win vs. Georgia, Boston made history the program's first triple-double in SEC play finishing with 16 points, 11 rebounds, and 10 blocks. Against LSU, Boston notched her third straight double-double with 20 points, 14 rebounds. Facing a tough double team against Alabama, Boston remained poised and handed out a career high 6 assist to go with 13 rebounds. In a road game against UConn, Boston completed her eighth double-double on the season, pulling down 15 rebounds, including eight in the final 15 minutes.

Boston was crucial in the Gamecocks SEC Tournament Championship win, in the semifinals vs. Tennessee, Boston scored 15 points and 11 rebounds, and in the finals against Georgia scored 27 points, 10 rebounds. Boston was named SEC Tournament MVP, she recorded double doubles in all three of the Gamecocks games. In her NCAA Tournament debut against no. 16th seeded Mercer, she would notch a 20 point and 18 rebound game. In the elite eight against Texas, Boston scored six of her ten points the first quarter. Boston had 16 rebounds in the season ending loss against Stanford and missed a potential game winning lay-up at the buzzer as South Carolina lost 66-65. At the conclusion of the season, she was named Lisa Leslie award winner for the second straight year, was named consensus First Team All-American, and was named National Player of the year by The Athletic.

Boston is also the first sophomore ever to be named by the College Sports Information Directors of America as its Academic All-American of the Year in D-I women's basketball, being so honored in 2021.

Junior season

On February 24 she broke the SEC record with her 20th consecutive double-double in the win at Texas A&M.

In the Final Four she had in a win against #4 Louisville, 15 points and 10 rebounds. In South Carolina's 64–49 National Championship win over UConn, Boston had 11 points and 16 rebounds for her 30th double-double of the season. It was the program’s second National Championship, She was named the NCAA Tournament MOP.

Senior season

Boston scored 14 points and grabbed 13 rebounds in South Carolina's 76–71 win at #2 Stanford. On November 27, 2022, Boston suffered a leg injury in a win against Hampton.

National team career

Boston has represented the United States at various international competitions, including the 2017 FIBA Under-16 Women's Americas Championship, 2018 Summer Youth Olympics, 2018 FIBA Under-17 Women's Basketball World Cup, and 2019 FIBA Under-19 Women's Basketball World Cup winning gold each time, she was named MVP of the FIBA Americas U16 Championship. Boston also won gold at the 2021 FIBA Women's AmeriCup.

Career statistics

National Team

Youth

Senior

College

|-
| style="text-align:left;"| 2019-20
| style="text-align:left;"| South Carolina
| 33 || 32 || 23.8 || 60.8 || 16.7 || 73.8 || 9.4 || 1.0 || 1.3 || 2.6 || 1.1 || 12.5 

|-
| style="text-align:left;"| 2020-21
| style="text-align:left;"| South Carolina
| 31 || 31 || 30.3 || 48.5 || 26.5 || 76.4 || 11.5 || 1.6 || 1.2 || 2.6 || 1.6 || 13.7 

|-
| style="text-align:left;"| 2021-22
| style="text-align:left;"| South Carolina
| 37 || 37 || 27.5 || 54.2 || 29.2 || 77.1 || 12.5 || 2.0 || 1.2 || 2.4 || 1.5 || 16.8 

|-
| style="text-align:left;"| 2022-23
| style="text-align:left;"| South Carolina
| 14 || 14 || 23.5 || 56.3 || 0.0 || 74.1 || 8.9 || 1.4 || 0.5 || 1.6 || 1.4 || 11.4

|-
| colspan=2; style="text-align:center;"| Career
| 115 || 114 || 26.7 || 54.4 || 24.8 || 75.8 || 10.9 || 1.5 || 1.1 || 2.4 || 1.4 || 14.1 
|}

Awards

High school
 USA Today Massachusetts Player of the Year (2019)
 Gatorade Massachusetts Player of the Year (2017, 2018, 2019)
 Naismith All-America Second Team (2019)
 WBCA All-America Second Team (2019)
 McDonald's All-America (2019)
 SLAM All-America (2019)

College
 3× Lisa Leslie Award (2020–2022)
 3× AP first-team All-American (2021–2023)
 3× USBWA first-team All-American (2021–2023)
 2x WBCA first-team All-American (2021–2022)
 AP second-team All-American (2020)
 USBWA second-team All-American (2020)
 USBWA National Freshman of the Year (2020)
 WBCA Freshman of the Year (2020)
 Honda-Broderick Cup (2022)
 Honda Sports Award for basketball (2022)
 SEC Freshman of the Year (2020)
 SEC tournament MVP (2021, 2023)
 4× SEC first team (2020–2023)
 4× SEC Defensive Player of the Year (2020, 2021, 2022, 2023)
 4× SEC All-Defensive team (2020–2023)
 2× Academic All-American of the Year, D-I women's basketball (2021, 2022)
 2x SEC Player of the Year (2022, 2023)
 Naismith College Player of the Year (2022)
 Naismith Defensive Player of the Year (2022)
 Associated Press Women's College Basketball Player of the Year (2022)
 Wade Trophy (2022)
 USBWA Women's National Player of the Year (2022)
 John R. Wooden Award (2022)
 NCAA Tournament Most Outstanding Player (2022)

International
 FIBA Under-16 Women's Americas Championship MVP (2017)
 FIBA Under-17 Women's Basketball World Cup All-Tournament Team (2018)

References

External links
South Carolina Gamecocks bio
ESPN Player Overview
 
 
 
 

2001 births
Living people
21st-century American women
American women's basketball players
Basketball players at the 2018 Summer Youth Olympics
Basketball players from Worcester, Massachusetts
Centers (basketball)
McDonald's High School All-Americans
People from Saint Thomas, U.S. Virgin Islands
Power forwards (basketball)
South Carolina Gamecocks women's basketball players
United States women's national basketball team players
United States Virgin Islands women's basketball players
Worcester Academy alumni
Youth Olympic gold medalists for the United States